The Miami Marlins are a Major League Baseball (MLB) franchise based in Miami, Florida. They play in the National League East division. Since the franchise was established in 1993 as the Florida Marlins, the Marlins have selected 35 players in the first round. Officially known as the "First-Year Player Draft", the Rule 4 Draft is MLB's primary mechanism for assigning players from high schools, colleges, and other amateur clubs to its franchises. The draft order is determined based on the previous season's standings, with the team possessing the worst record receiving the first pick. In addition, teams which lost free agents in the previous off-season may be awarded compensatory or supplementary picks. The First-Year Player Draft is unrelated to the 1992 expansion draft in which the Marlins filled their roster.

Of the 35 players picked in the first round by the Marlins, 20 have been pitchers, the most of any position; 11 of these were right-handed, while nine were left-handed. Six outfielders were selected and three players each were taken at first base, third base, and catcher. The Marlins have also drafted one shortstop in the first round, though they have never taken a second baseman. Seven of the players came from high schools or universities in the state of California; Florida and Texas schools each produced four players; and Louisiana schools produced three.

Two of the Marlins' first-round picks have won championships with the franchise. Charles Johnson (1992) won a World Series title on the 1997 championship team and Josh Beckett (1999) won with the 2003 team. Beckett also went on to be a part of the Boston Red Sox 2007 World Series championship team. Chris Coghlan (2006) is the only first-round pick of the Marlins to win the Rookie of the Year Award, taking the honor in 2009. None of their first-round picks have been elected to the Baseball Hall of Fame or won the Most Valuable Player or Cy Young Award. The Marlins have made three selections in the supplemental round of the draft and have made the first overall selection once (2000). They have also had five compensatory picks since their first draft in 1992. These additional picks are provided when a team loses a particularly valuable free agent in the previous off-season, or, more recently, if a team fails to sign a draft pick from the previous year. The Marlins have never failed to sign a first-round pick.

Key

Picks

See also
Miami Marlins minor league players

Footnotes
Through the 2012 draft, free agents were evaluated by the Elias Sports Bureau and rated "Type A", "Type B", or not compensation-eligible. If a team offered arbitration to a player but that player refused and subsequently signed with another team, the original team was able to receive additional draft picks. If a "Type A" free agent left in this way, his previous team received a supplemental pick and a compensatory pick from the team with which he signed. If a "Type B" free agent left in this way, his previous team received only a supplemental pick. Since the 2013 draft, free agents are no longer classified by type; instead, compensatory picks are only awarded if the team offered its free agent a contract worth at least the average of the 125 current richest MLB contracts. However, if the free agent's last team acquired the player in a trade during the last year of his contract, it is ineligible to receive compensatory picks for that player.
The Marlins lost their first-round pick in 2001 to the Chicago White Sox as compensation for signing free agent Charles Johnson.
The Marlins gained a compensatory first-round pick in 2005 from the San Francisco Giants as compensation for losing free agent Armando Benítez.
The Marlins gained a compensatory first-round pick in 2005 from the New York Yankees as compensation for losing free agent Carl Pavano.
The Marlins gained a supplemental first-round pick in 2005 for losing free agent Armando Benítez.
The Marlins gained a supplemental first-round pick in 2005 for losing free agent Carl Pavano.
The Marlins gained a supplemental first-round pick in 2006 for losing free agent A. J. Burnett.
The Marlins received a supplemental first-round pick from the Pittsburgh Pirates, along with outfielder Gorkys Hernández, on July 31, 2012, in exchange for Gaby Sánchez and minor league pitcher Kyle Kaminska. The Pirates received the pick as a result of the 2012 Competitive Balance Lottery.

References
General references

In-text citations

First-round draft picks
Miami Marlins